The Toilers and the Wayfarers  is a 1997 LGBT-related dramatic film written and directed by Keith Froelich.  It was released on 14 March 1997.

The film was both set in and filmed in New Ulm, located in Brown County of southern Minnesota.

Premise
Phillip and Dieter nearly suffocate hiding their gay sexual identity in the face of puritanical small town Midwestern U.S. values. Joined by a mysterious German relative, the three misfits escape to the big city searching for a place to belong.

Cast
Matt Klemp as Dieter
Ralf Schirg as Udo
Andrew Woodhouse as Phillip
Jerome Samuels as Helmut
Joan Wheeler as Anna
Michael Glen as Lt. Scallion
Ralph Jacobus as Carl
Douglas Blacks as Gym Coach / Man at Bus Depot
Anthony C. Paul as Paul
Johanna Stucki as Renate
Alex Cole as Car Dealer
Michael A. Sward as Gay Hustler

External links
 
 The Star Tribune, Lifestyles Section: "The Toilers and the Wayfarers"  — article by Jeff Strickler (26 June 1997).

1997 films
1997 drama films
1997 LGBT-related films
American teen LGBT-related films
LGBT-related drama films
LGBT in Minnesota
Films set in Minnesota
Films shot in Minnesota
Films about male prostitution in the United States
German-American culture in Minnesota
1990s German-language films
German emigrants to the United States
German LGBT-related films
New Ulm, Minnesota
American black-and-white films
American drama films
1990s English-language films
1990s American films
1990s German films